Centrostephanus rodgersii is a species of sea urchin of the family Diadematidae.

Description 
It is a big, dark-purple sea urchin, with long and slender spines, reflecting a green tinge in the light. The shell can be reddish.

Distribution and habitat 
This sea urchin can be found in New Zealand and south-east Australia.

References 

Diadematidae
Animals described in 1863